Sele may refer to:

Places

Africa
Sele, Burkina Faso, a village in the Ouéleni Department of Burkina Fase.
 Sele, Ethiopia, a town in Agbe municipality

Asia
Sele, Turkey, a Turkish village in Kailar in Ottoman times
Şələ, Azerbaijan
Seleucia (Susiana), an ancient city now in Iran formerly called Sele

Europe
Sele Mill, a former watermill in Hertfordshire, England
Sele, West Sussex, an English hamlet
Sele Priory, a Benedictine monastery in modern-day Upper Beeding, West Sussex
Zell, Carinthia, the Slovene name
Sele, Norway, two villages with this name in Øygarden, Norway

River Sele (river), in southwestern Italy

People with the surname
Aaron Sele, American baseball player
Baron Saye and Sele, an aristocratic title (the family surname is Fiennes)